
Gmina Pisz is an urban-rural gmina (administrative district) in Pisz County, Warmian-Masurian Voivodeship, in northern Poland.

The gmina contains part of the protected area called Masurian Landscape Park.

Villages
Apart from the town of Pisz, Gmina Pisz contains the villages and settlements of Anuszewo, Babrosty, Bogumiły, Borki, Ciesina, Czarny Róg, Dziadki, Hejdyk, Imionek, Jabłoń, Jagodne, Jaśkowo, Jaśkowo-Leśniczówka, Jeglin, Jeże, Karpa, Karwik, Kocioł, Kocioł Duży, Kociołek Szlachecki, Kulik, Kwik, Lipa Przednia, Lipa Tylna, Lisie Jamy, Liski, Łupki, Łysonie, Maldanin, Maszty, Niedźwiedzie, Nowe Uściany, Pietrzyki, Pilchy, Piskorzewo, Pogobie Średnie, Pogobie Tylne, Rakowo Piskie, Rostki, Rybitwy, Snopki, Stare Guty, Stare Uściany, Szczechy Małe, Szczechy Wielkie, Szeroki Bór Piski, Szparki, Trzonki, Turośl, Turowo, Turowo Duże, Wądołek, Wąglik, Wąglik-Kolonia, Wiartel, Wiartel Mały, Wielki Las, Zaroślak, Zawady, Zdory, Zdunowo and Zimna.

Neighbouring gminas
Gmina Pisz is bordered by the gminas of Biała Piska, Kolno, Łyse, Mikołajki, Orzysz, Rozogi, Ruciane-Nida and Turośl.

References
Polish official population figures 2006

Pisz
Pisz County